Club Atlético 3 de Febrero is a professional Paraguayan football club from Ciudad del Este, the capital city of the department of Alto Paraná. The club was founded in 1970, and named after St. Blaise Day, a national holiday throughout many Hispanic countries. 3 de Febrero have played 9 seasons (2005, 2006, 2007, 2008, 2009, 2010, 2011, 2014, 2018) in the Primera División Paraguaya. At present plays in the Second Division of the Paraguayan league.

History

The team started playing in the Liga Paranaense and finally made their way to the second division of the Paraguayan League in 2000.

In 2004 the club won the second division title and got promoted to the first division.

In 2011, the club was relegated to the Paraguayan 2nd division, but won the title again in 2013, once again being promoted to the first division.

Stadium

3 de Febrero's stadium is the Estadio Antonio Aranda, also known as Estadio 3 de Febrero. It is located next to Ciudad del Este's bus terminal. The stadium is on the Avenue General Bernardino Caballero, and was opened in 1973. The capacity of the stadium, is 28,000. It has a grass surface and was renovated in 1999, for which it was utilized as one of the venues of the 1999 Copa América. Fixtures of the 2004 South American U-16 Championship and the 2007 South American U-20 Championship were also disputed at the stadium. The stadium is Paraguay's third largest, according to its seating capacity. The stadium was the venue which saw Paraguayan footballers, Roque Santa Cruz score his first international goal for the Albirroja on 17 June 1999 in a friendly match against Uruguay, and Nelson Haedo score his first international goal for the Albirroja on 17 August 2005 in a friendly match against El Salvador.

Gallery

Honours
División Intermedia: 2
2004, 2013

Primera División B Nacional: 1
2000

Regional Titles (Alto Paraná League): 6
1973, 1975, 1977, 1986, 1992, 1997

Current squad
As of March 2021.

Notable players
To appear in this section a player must have either:
 Played at least 125 games for the club.
 Set a club record or won an individual award while at the club.
 Been part of a national team at any time.
 Played in the first division of any other football association (outside of Paraguay).
 Played in a continental and/or intercontinental competition.

1990's
 Justo Jacquet (1994)
2000's
 Ignacio Paniagua (2000–2001)
 Celso Guerrero (2001)
 Darío Espínola (2001)
 Óscar Cardozo (2003–2004)
 Angel Antar (2003)
 Juan Cardozo (2004–2005)
 Juan Ramón Jara (2005)
  Osvaldo Mendoza (2005)
 Edgar Robles (2005)
 Milton Benítez (2006, 2008–2010)
 Fidencio Oviedo (2006)
 Blas López (2006)
 Miguel Cárdenas (2006)
 Pablo Caballero (2006)
 Jorge Valdez (2007)
 Eric Ramos (2007)
 Richard Salinas (2007)
 Rodrigo Romero (2008)
 José Antonio Franco (2008)
 Gustavo Mencia (2008)
 Felipe Villalba (2008–2012)
 Troadio Duarte (2008, 2009)
 César Llamas (2008–2011, 2013–)
 Rafael Baiano (2009, 2010–2011)
2010's
 Miguel Ángel Cuéllar (2010)
 Henry Lapczyk (2010)
 Hugo Santacruz (2010, 2014)
 Carlos Antonio Mereles (2011)
 Osvaldo Moreno (2011)
 Delio Toledo (2011)
 Gilberto Velásquez (2011)
 Derlis Cardozo (2011–2013)
 Joel Zayas (2011–2012)
 Diego Balbinot (2012–2014)
 Derlis Gómez (2012)
 Jorge Salinas (2014)
 Antony Silva (2014)
 Julio Aguilar (2014)
 Rodrigo Burgos (2014)
 Ricardo Mazacotte (2014)
 Leonardo Migliónico (2014–)
 Hugo Iriarte (2014)
 Juan Pablo Raponi (2014)
 Domingo Salcedo (2014)
 Alejandro Prieto (2018–)
 Bruno Renan (2018–)
Non-CONMEBOL players
 Thiago França (2011)

References

External links
 Official Website

3 de Febrero
Ciudad del Este
Association football clubs established in 1970
1970 establishments in Paraguay